Steven Richard Moraff (born 1963) is a video game designer and programmer best known for a series of MS-DOS shareware games launched in the late 1980s and early 1990s. The games were sold under the name Moraffware (sometimes written as MoraffWare) and usually included his surname in the title, such as Moraff's Revenge, Moraff's World, and Moraff's Stones.

Early life
Raised in Ithaca, New York, Steve Moraff's father was an IBM employee who worked on Cornell's mainframe and his mother was a child development expert. Moraff began programming in a free computer lab provided by a local non-profit trying to start a science museum in Ithaca. He briefly attended the Alternative Community School but later dropped out of school and, after taking some courses at the local Community College, he obtained his GED.

Game development
In the late 1980s, Moraff began programming games for MS-DOS, culminating in the 1988 release of Moraff's Revenge, which was distributed using a shareware model. This launched the company that became Moraffware and later Software Diversions, Inc. (SDI), based in Florida, which specializes in mahjong solitaire-type games.

References

American video game designers
American computer programmers
1963 births
Living people
Shareware